Andy Murray defeated Jo-Wilfried Tsonga in the final, 6–3, 7–6(8–6) to win the singles tennis title at the 2016 Vienna Open.

David Ferrer was the defending champion, but withdrew from his semifinal match against Murray.

Seeds

Draw

Finals

Top half

Bottom half

Qualifying

Seeds

Qualifiers

Qualifying draw

First qualifier

Second qualifier

Third qualifier

Fourth qualifier

External links
 Main draw
 Qualifying draw

Erste Bank Open - Singles
2016 Singles
Erste Bank Open Singles